Goniaceritae is a supertribe of ant-loving beetles in the family Staphylinidae. There are about 16 genera and at least 30 described species in Goniaceritae.

Genera
These 16 genera belong to the supertribe Goniaceritae:

 Brachygluta Thomson, 1859 i c g b
 Custotychus Park & Wagner, 1962 i c g b
 Cylindrarctus Schaufuss, 1887 i c g b
 Decarthron Brendel, 1865 i c g b
 Eupsenius LeConte, 1849 i c g b
 Eutrichites LeConte, 1880 i c g b
 Lucifotychus Park & Wagner, 1962 i c g b
 Machaerodes Brendel, 1890 i c g b
 Nearctitychus Chandler, 1988 i c g b
 Nisaxis Casey, 1886 i c g b
 Pselaptrichus Brendel, 1889 i c g b
 Reichenbachia Leach, 1826 i c g b
 Rybaxis Saulcy, 1876 i c g b
 Tychobythinus Ganglbauer, 1896 i c g b
 Tychus Leach, 1817 c g b
 Valda Casey, 1894 i c g b

Data sources: i = ITIS, c = Catalogue of Life, g = GBIF, b = Bugguide.net

References

Further reading

External links

 

Supertribes
Pselaphinae